Bielsk Podlaski  is a town in eastern Poland, within Bielsk County in the Podlaskie Voivodeship. As of December 2021, the town has a population of 24,883.

Geography
Bielsk Podlaski is located in the geographical region of Europe known as the Podlasie-Belarus Plateau (Polish: Wysoczyzny Podlasko-Białoruskie) and the mesoregion known as the Bielsk plain (Polish: Równina Bielska).

Location

History

Bielsk Podlaski has a long and rich history, dating back to the 12th century, when this area of Poland belonged to Kievan Rus'. The gord of Bielsk was probably founded by Ruthenian dukes, and its existence was first mentioned in 1253, in the so-called Hypatian Codex. In 1273, Bielsk was captured by Lithuanian duke Traidenis, and in the early 14th century, whole province of Podlasie became annexed by the Grand Duchy of Lithuania. The region was subject to Teutonic Knights raids, which took place in 1346 and 1379.

In 1382, Masovian Duke Janusz I of Warsaw captured Bielsk, Drohiczyn, Suraż and Mielnik, taking advantage of the Lithuanian Civil War (1381–84). Next year, Jogaila pushed the Mazovians out of Bielsko, handing the gord over to Vytautas (Witold). In 1390, Jogaila, who had become King of Poland as Władysław II Jagiełło, handed Bielsk, Suraż, Drohiczyn and Mielnik over to Janusz I.

Due to its convenient location along a merchant route from Kraków to Vilnius, Bielsk became an important center of trade and administration. In late November 1412, it was visited by King Władysław II Jagiełło, and 1413, the Land of Drohiczyn, together with Bielsk, became part of Trakai Voivodeship. In 1430, Duke Vytautas named first vogt of Bielsko, a man named Andrzej. A number of Poles from Mazovia begin to settle in Podlasie.

Bielsk received its Magdeburg rights town charter on 18 November 1495, from King Alexander I Jagiellon. In September 1501, a meeting of Lithuanian nobility took place here. Several Polish rulers visited Bielsk, such as Władysław II Jagiełło, Alexander I (1505), Sigismund I the Old (1506, 1509), and Sigismund II Augustus (1564). In 1513, Bielsk was named capital of the newly created Podlaskie Voivodeship; by 1563, the town had 830 houses, and was also main center of the Land of Bielsko.

In early summer of 1564, when king Sigismund II Augustus stayed here with Primate Jakub Uchański, to discuss the new Polish-Lithuanian union (see Union of Lublin), the wooden castle of Bielsk burned to the ground, with the king watching the incident from the stables. A new castle for the local starosta was built in Hołowiesko (located within present-day town limits of Bielsk), while the land court was moved to Brańsk.

Following the Union of Lublin (1569), Bielsko was transferred from Grand Duchy of Lithuania into the Kingdom of Poland. Bielsk was a royal town of Poland, administratively located in the Podlaskie Voivodeship in the Lesser Poland Province of the Polish Crown. The town prospered, with churches, hospital, mills, shops and 265 artisans (as for 1576). Bielsko burned in 1591, and Swedish invasion of Poland brought almost complete destruction (1655).

The Carmelites Church in Bielsk and monastery was founded in 1641 by magnate Adam Kazanowski (starost of Bielsk from 1638) and dedicated to the Mother of God of Mount Carmel. The project was also financed by his wife Elżbieta (Halszka) Słuszczanka (around 1619-1671).

Following the Third Partition of Poland, Bielsk briefly belonged to the Kingdom of Prussia (1795-1807): after the Treaties of Tilsit, it was transferred to the Russian Empire. From 1843, it belonged to the Grodno Governorate. Residents of the area actively participated in the largest 19th-century Polish uprisings (November Uprising and January Uprising). Bielsk was one of the sites of Russian executions of Polish insurgents during the January Uprising of 1863-1864. Additionally, in September 1863, as punishment for supporting the uprising, Russians plundered the nearby village of Łukawica, and expelled its entire population, which was forcibly marched to Bielsk, and then deported to katorga in Siberia. Two people died during the march from Łukawica to Bielsk: an old man and a child. As part of the post-uprising anti-Polish repressions, the town was subjected to Russification, the local Catholic church was closed down, and Polish clergy was also deported to Siberia. Edward Kiersnowski, leader of a local insurgent unit, who fought in several battles in the region, died while being deported to Siberia in 1864. In 1873, Bielsk received rail connection with Brest Litovsk, and in 1915, during World War I, German troops burned the rail station. Germans retreated from the town in February 1919, and were replaced by Polish Army units. In late July 1920, during the Polish-Soviet War, Bielsk was briefly occupied by the Red Army. In the Second Polish Republic, Bielsk administratively belonged to the Białystok Voivodeship.

During the 1939 joint German-Soviet invasion of Poland, which started World War II, the town was captured by the Wehrmacht, which on 23 September handed it over to the Soviets, who occupied it until 23 June 1941, forcibly sending thousands to Siberia. In 1941-1944, the town was occupied by Nazi Germany. Germans murdered its Jewish minority, and in a nearby forest killed approximately 800 Poles. The Germans also operated a forced labour camp in the town. A pogrom took place in Bielsk Podlaski from July 5–7, 1941. Between November 2 and 11, 1942, approximately 7,000 local Jews and 4,000 more from Boćki, Brańsk, Narew, and Orla, were deported from the ghetto of Bielsk Podlaski to Treblinka. Bielsk was captured by the Red Army on 30 July 1944. The Russians then carried out arrests of local Polish resistance members, including 12 officers of the local command of the Home Army, who were arrested on 4 August 1944 in nearby Brańsk, where they were deceitfully gathered for a supposed formal meeting with the command of the Soviet 65th Army. The town was soon restored to Poland.

Bielsk Podlaski has a rich Jewish history which was wiped out in the Holocaust.

Demographics
Detailed data as of 31 December 2021:

1897 census
The most spoken languages in Bielsk Podlaski according to the Russian Imperial Census of 1897:

Municipal government

Executive branch
The chief executive of the government is the mayor (Polish: Burmistrz). As of 2022, the mayor of Bielsk Podlaski is Jarosław Bobrowski.

Legislative branch
The legislative portion of the government is the council (Polish: Rada), composed of the president (Polish: Przewodniczący), the vice president (Polish: Wiceprzewodniczący) and thirteen councilors.

Neighbouring political subdivisions
Bielsk Podlaski (town) is bordered by Gmina Bielsk Podlaski. The town is the seat of Gmina Bielsk Podlaski, although it is not a part of it.

Climate
The region has a continental climate which is characterized by high temperatures during summer and long and frosty winters. The average amount of rainfall during the year exceeds .

Transport

Roads
Bielsk Podlaski is at the intersection of two national roads and a voivodeship road:
  - Kuźnica Białostocka border crossing (Belarus) - Kuźnica - Białystok - Bielsk Podlaski - Siemiatycze - Międzyrzec Podlaski - Kock - Lubartów - Lublin - Kraśnik - Janów Lubelski - Nisko - Sokołów Małopolski - Rzeszów
  - Zambrów - Brańsk - Bielsk Podlaski - Kleszczele - Czeremcha - Połowce border crossing (Belarus)
  - Bielsk Podlaski - Hajnówka - Białowieża - border crossing (Belarus)

Sports

International relations

Twin towns - sister cities
Bielsk Podlaski is twinned with:

 Călăraşi, Moldova
 Călăraşi, Romania
 Dve Mogili, Bulgaria
 Kingisepp, Russia
 Kobryn, Belarus
 Rakhiv, Ukraine
 Svetlahorsk, Belarus

Notable people

 Nadzieja Artymowicz, Belarusian poet
 Wojciech Borecki, football manager
 Jarosław Borowski, scrablista
 Yakau Branshteyn, Belarusian literary critic
 Piotr Bujko, Ukrainian doctor of Belarusian origin
 Mirosław Car, football player
 Małgorzata Dmitruk, painter
 Lech Feszler, senator
 Doroteusz Fionik, ethnographer
 Ignacy Fonberg, chemist
 Marta Gryko, actress
 Father Leon Knabit, Benedictine priest
 Cezary Kosiński, actor
 Józef Lewartowski, activist
 Kamila Lićwinko, high jumper, gold medallist at the 2014 World Indoor Athletics Championships
 Josif Łangbard, Belarusian architect
 Jerzy Plutowicz, poet
 Małgorzata Prokopiuk-Kępka, journalist
 Maciej Radel, actor
 Kamila Stepaniuk, athlete
 Rościsław Stepaniuk, pilot
 Captain Władysław Wysocki, recipient of the Virtuti Militari
 Mina Bern (1911-2010); Yiddish theatre actress
 Zoja Saczko, poet
 Antoni Stalewski, recipient of the Virtuti Militari
 Aryeh Leib Yellin, Rabbi

Gallery

References

External links

 Official website 
 Jewish community of Bielsk Podlaski on Virtual Shtetl
 Bielsk Podlaski at JewishGen

Cities and towns in Podlaskie Voivodeship
Bielsk County
Podlachian Voivodeship
Belsky Uyezd (Grodno Governorate)
Białystok Voivodeship (1919–1939)
Belastok Region
Shtetls
Holocaust locations in Poland